The Meat-Shaped Stone is a piece of jasper carved into the shape of a piece of Dongpo pork, a popular Chinese way of cooking pork belly. It is part of the collection of the National Palace Museum in Taipei, Taiwan.  Although of only moderate importance from the point of view of art history, it is a great popular favourite with visitors and has become famous.

The Meat-Shaped Stone has been called the "most famous masterpiece" of the entire National Palace Museum, and along with the Jadeite Cabbage and the Mao Gong Ding, is today called one of the Three Treasures of the National Palace Museum, a redesignation from several less accessible, infrequently-displayed works. It has also been chosen by the public as the most important item in the museum's entire collection.

History
The stone was carved during the Qing dynasty from banded jasper. The layers of the stone accumulated naturally over the years, with various shades of hues. The craftsman who carved the stone stained the skin, which resulted in a realistic looking piece of stone with multiple layers appearing like layers of fat and meat.

Gallery

See also
Jadeite Cabbage

References

Chinese sculpture
National Palace Museum
Qing dynasty art